Bezgenriet (361 m above sea level) is the most southern district of Göppingen in Germany. Schopflenberg, which was created after Second World War by increased influx of refugees and displaced persons, belongs to the Stadtteil Bezgenriet .

History 
In 1110, Konrad II, Count of Württemberg gave parts of Pathicenriedt to the Blaubeuren Abbey, and this marks the first mention of the later name Bezgenriet.
The place came in 1477 to the Office Göppingen. On 1 October 1957 Bezgenriet was incorporated as a district to Göppingen.

Transportation 
Bezgenriet is connected by the country road 1419 to the west with Hattenhofen  and Schopflenberg, and to the east with Heiningen. The Staufer Street (Straße der Staufer) leads as country road 1214 through Bezgenriet, in one direction to Jebenhausen and in the other direction to Boll. 
The connection point Aichelberg of the Bundesautobahn 8 is in a distance of about 8 kilometers.

The nearest train stations are Göppingen and Faurndau.

Attractions
The Laurentius Church was built in 1405 and is known for its frescoes of the Last Judgement. The frescoes were discovered after World War II during renovation work.

The Catholic Herz-Jesu-Kirche is in Schopflenberg.

Literature 
 Der Kreis Göppingen. Konrad Theiss Verlag, Stuttgart 1978, .

References

External links 
 

Former municipalities in Baden-Württemberg